Members of the New South Wales Legislative Assembly who served in the 56th Parliament held their seats from 2015 to 2019.  They were as elected at the 2015 state election and at by-elections. The Speaker was Shelley Hancock.

See also
Second Baird ministry
First Berejiklian ministry
Results of the 2015 New South Wales state election (Legislative Assembly)
Candidates of the 2015 New South Wales state election

References

Members of New South Wales parliaments by term
20th-century Australian politicians
New South Wales Legislative Assembly